HD 135530 is a suspected variable star in the northern constellation of Boötes.

References

External links
 HR 5677
 Image HD 135530

Boötes
135530
074571
M-type giants
5677
Suspected variables
Durchmusterung objects